Fotios Zaharoglou is a Greek computer scientist. He received his Diploma in Electrical Engineering from Aristotle University of Thessaloniki in 1986,
his MS in Electrical Engineering from the California Institute of Technology in 1987, and his PhD in  Computer Science from the University of California, San Diego in 1993. His work on the applications of topology to the theory of distributed computing along with Maurice Herlihy, Michael Saks and Nir Shavit, was awarded the 2004 Gödel Prize.

References

External links
Bibliography of Fotios Zaharoglou

Theoretical computer scientists
Gödel Prize laureates
Greek computer scientists
Living people
Aristotle University of Thessaloniki alumni
Year of birth missing (living people)